George Campbell (17 October 1872 – 28 March 1924) was a Scotland international rugby union player.

Rugby Union career

Amateur career

Campbell played with London Scottish.

Provincial career

He was selected for Middlesex to play against Yorkshire in the 1893 English County Championship. Five Scots were selected for Middlesex: Gregor MacGregor, George Campbell, William Wotherspoon, Robert MacMillan and Frederick Goodhue, all with London Scottish who played in the county. He played in that match, but Yorkshire won and then secured the championship.

Campbell played for the Anglo-Scots in 1898.

International career

Campbell played in 17 international matches for Scotland.

References

1872 births
1924 deaths
Scottish rugby union players
Scotland international rugby union players
Rugby union players from West Sussex
London Scottish F.C. players
Scottish Exiles (rugby union) players
Rugby union centres
Middlesex County RFU players